Forestside Shopping Centre (better known as Forestside) is located in Newtownbreda in the southern suburbs of Belfast, Northern Ireland. The first phase of the centre, the  Sainsbury's store, opened in March 1997. The popularity of the centre has exceeded expectations with traffic congestion a problem in peak trading seasons. Sainsbury's was obliged to pay for extensive roadworks on the A24/A55 junction.

History

When Sainsbury's announced its move into the Northern Ireland market on 20 June 1995, the Newtownbreda site was one of seven identified for future stores. The site was then occupied by Supermac which, when it opened in 1964, was Northern Ireland's first supermarket. Supermac had planned to redevelop the site itself in a £30 million project, however a company director pointed out that the firm would be at the peak of its overdraft at the same time as facing competition from Sainsbury's opening its first store in Northern Ireland. The Irish Times quotes the director as saying "That was a situation we didn't find particularly acceptable."

Planning permission for the Sainsbury's store was granted in early February 1996 and construction by John Laing Group began with a groundbreaking ceremony a week later. The Sainsbury's store was built on the northern part of the roughly triangular site which was unoccupied as part of the Supermac complex. Sainsbury's first annual report after the store opened in March 1997 noted that the store was "trading far above expectations".

Sainsbury's paid £1.75 million for an alcohol sales licence for its off-licence in the centre. However this allowed Sainsbury's, with just two off-licences open in Northern Ireland in 1997, to capture 6% of the market. In January 1998 The Grocer reported that sales at the Forestside off-licence were £140,000 a week.

As the first stage opened work continued on the final stage of the shopping mall, 31 small units and two other large stores occupied by Marks & Spencer and Dunnes Stores. The total floor space of the centre is  the southern part of the which stands on the site of the Supermac supermarket. The architects of the centre took advantage of the large east–west gradient of the site to build underground car parking and service access. Sainsbury's opened a petrol filling station at the same time as the supermarket, on the site of the demolished Drumkeen Hotel.

In October 1997 Sainsbury's announced the forward sale of Forestside to the Universities Superannuation Scheme (USS) for approximately £50m. The sale was completed following completion of building works in September 1998, with Sainsbury's taking a 125-year lease for its store. In January 2001 USS sold the centre to Foyleside Ltd. for £70 million. Foyleside Ltd. owns Foyleside in Derry and the Abbey Centre in Newtownabbey.

On 26 March 2005 the centre's Next outlet was targeted with an incendiary device which ignited after it had closed. Another device was defused in the centre's Dunnes Stores on 28 March. The campaign, which also included an attack that destroyed a B&Q store at Sprucefield, Co. Down, was blamed on dissident republicans.

On 23 November 2006 Marks & Spencer announced a £35 million investment in its Northern Ireland business, £8 million of which was invested in its Forestside store. This involved remodelling, the addition of a second floor to add  and a multi-storey car park.

In 2012 Game closed its branch in Forestside along with many others across the UK after the company entered administration.

In 2013 HMV closed its branch in Forestside along with 65 others across the UK after the company entered administration.

In an article discussing the reform of local government, The Belfast Telegraph described Forestside as a "cash cow" which delivers annual rates of over £4 million to its local authority.
In summer 2013 River Island, Dorothy Perkins, Wallis and Evans all closed. Next expanded into the former River Island Unit. Other new retailers to open included O2 store, Vision Express and Blue Inc.

During the COVID-19 pandemic several of the companies owning units such as Warehouse and Oasis (Owned by Aurora Fashions) and Clintons went into administration. The latter unit was purchased by Hallmark cards

References

Shopping centres in Northern Ireland
Buildings and structures in Belfast
Tourist attractions in Belfast